is a former Japanese football player.

Playing career
Yajima first joined then J2 team Kawasaki Frontale. He only made one start for Kawasaki before signing for S-Pulse for the 2006 season where he's been a regular partner for striker Cho Jae-Jin. Yajima's first J.League goal came against Gamba Osaka in April 2006. In January 2009, he transferred back to Kawasaki Frontale.

Club statistics

References

External links

Kawasaki Frontale

1984 births
Living people
Waseda University alumni
Association football people from Shiga Prefecture
Japanese footballers
J1 League players
J2 League players
Kawasaki Frontale players
Shimizu S-Pulse players
Yokohama F. Marinos players
Kyoto Sanga FC players
Association football forwards